The 2015 PLDT Home Ultera PSL Beach Volleyball Challenge Cup was the inaugural beach volleyball tournament of the Philippine Super Liga and the second tournament for its third season. The conference began on July 18, 2015 and ended on August 8, 2015 at the newly opened The Sands, SM By The Bay (SM Mall of Asia). The games were held for four consecutive Saturdays. The tournament was co-sponsored by Smart Communications.

Women's Division

Preliminary round

Pool A

|}

|}

Pool B

|}

|}

Pool C

|}

|}

Pool D

|}

|}

Playoffs

For 11th place

|}

For 9th place

|}

Quarterfinals

|}

|}

For 7th place

|}

For 5th place

|}
NOTE: MERALCO won via default.

Semi-finals

|}

For 3rd place

|}

Women's Finals
Danika Gendrauli and Jane Diaz prevailed in the final game of the PSL's Beach VB Challenge Cup. Gendrauli of SWU (with her partner then, Raphil Aguilar) was used to play against Foton's Fiona Ceballos of CPU together with Army's regular Jovelyn Gonzaga in the finals of Nestea Intercollegiate Beach VB held in Boracay two years ago.

|}

Final standing
Gendrauli and Diaz will represent the country in the 2015 Spike For Peace Women’s International Beach Volleyball.

Men's Division

Preliminary round

Pool A

|}

|}

Pool B

|}

|}

Playoffs

For 9th place

|}
NOTE: UPHSD-B won via default.

For 7th place

|}

For 5th place

|}

Semi-finals

|}

For 3rd place

|}

NOTE: Cignal (Team A) won via default.

Men's Finals

|}

Final standing

Venue
 The Sands (SM By The Bay, SM Mall of Asia)

Broadcast partners
 TV5, AksyonTV, Sports5.ph

References

Philippine Super Liga
Beach volleyball competitions in the Philippines
PSL
PSL